The 2nd constituency of Drôme is a French legislative constituency in the Drôme département.

Deputies

Election Results

2022

 
 
 
 
 
 
 
 
|-
| colspan="8" bgcolor="#E9E9E9"|
|-

2017

2012

Sources
 Ministry of the Interior

2